Christopher Edward Hansen (born September 13, 1959) is an American television journalist and YouTube personality. He is known for his work on Dateline NBC, in particular the former segment To Catch a Predator, which revolved around catching potential Internet  predators using a sting operation.

He also hosts Killer Instinct on Investigation Discovery, which documents homicide investigations. In September 2016, he became the new host for the second season of the syndicated show Crime Watch Daily.

Early life and education
Hansen was born in Chicago, Illinois on September 13, 1959 and grew up in West Bloomfield Township and Birmingham, Michigan. In an interview with City Pulse, Hansen  said that he was first wanted to be a journalist when he was 14 years old, watching and following the police and FBI investigation of the disappearance of  Jimmy Hoffa. He attended Brother Rice High School in Bloomfield Hills, Michigan. Hansen graduated from Michigan State University with a Bachelor of Arts in telecommunication in 1981.

Career with NBC (1981–2013) 
In 1981, Hansen became a reporter for NBC affiliate WILX in Lansing, Michigan during his senior year at Michigan State University. He later reported for WFLA in Tampa, Florida,  various newspapers and radio stations in Michigan and WXYZ in Detroit. In 1988, he was hired as an investigative reporter and anchor at WDIV in Detroit. In May 1993, Hansen joined NBC News as a correspondent for the short-lived news magazine Now with Tom Brokaw and Katie Couric.

Dateline NBC
Hansen's notable work for Dateline includes coverage of the Columbine High School massacre, the Oklahoma City bombing, the Unabomber and the TWA Flight 800 disaster, and investigative reports on Indian child slave labor and counterfeit prescription drug sales in China. Hansen was responsible for most of Dateline's coverage of the September 11 attacks, as well as stories on terrorist groups and the operations of Al-Qaeda. He also exposed how a group linked to Osama Bin Laden had attempted to buy missiles and nuclear weapons components, and he also worked on an exclusive report on the Air France Flight 8969 hijacking. His series on deficient airport security resulted in the Federal Aviation Administration  investigating and ultimately revising its policies.

To Catch a Predator

In conjunction with the website Perverted-Justice, Hansen hosted a series of Dateline NBC reports under the title To Catch a Predator. Volunteers from Perverted-Justice impersonated minor children (usually 13–15 year old) in chat rooms online and agreed to meet with adults for sex. The meeting places were "sting houses", where camera crews from NBC, and in later episodes local police, awaited potential sexual predators.

Capitalizing on the success of Hansen and his Predator investigations, Dateline NBC created three Tuesday night spin-offs of its original concept; Hansen hosted To Catch a Con Man and To Catch an I.D. Thief. In March 2007, Hansen's book, To Catch a Predator: Protecting Your Kids from Online Enemies Already in Your Home, was released in the American market.

Dismissal 
In August 2013, NBC decided not to renew its contract with Hansen, ultimately ending his tenure of 20 years.

Post-NBC projects

Killer Instinct
In 2015, Hansen hosted Killer Instinct, a show on Investigation Discovery chronicling homicide cases. The show's initial 10-episode season premiered on August 17, 2015.

Hansen vs. Predators
In 2015, Hansen planned a new independent television show called Hansen vs. Predators, a spin-off of his original show To Catch a Predator. The program was intended to premiere online, crowdfunded via Kickstarter with Hansen hoping to raise $400,000, however the Kickstarter only raised $89,000. Hansen offered promotional memorabilia as part of the campaign that donors claimed to have never received, and he was arrested in January 2019 for paying for $13,000 worth of promotional items with a bad check. Later broadcast rights were sold, with Hansen vs. Predators becoming a recurring segment on Crime Watch Daily.

Crime Watch Daily 
On August 22, 2016, Hansen was introduced as the new host of the syndicated news program Crime Watch Daily beginning with its second-season premiere on September 12. Hansen anchors the program from New York City, but it will maintain its Los Angeles-based newsroom. The second season also saw the premiere of Hansen vs. Predator, a revival of his previous To Catch a Predator series. Hansen's entry brought further ratings gains to the program, with household ratings increasing by 20% to 1.0, and a 23% gain among women 18–34. On January 4, 2017, Crime Watch Daily was renewed for a third season. The show ended its run in June 2018. Chris Hansen debuted the first episode of Hansen vs. Predator on September 12, 2016, on Crime Watch Daily.

Have a Seat with Chris Hansen

On October 9, 2019, Hansen started a YouTube channel under the name Have a Seat with Chris Hansen, featuring weekly podcasts tackling different topics and interviews with special guests. In 2019, this channel investigated claims of pedophilia and grooming against YouTube creator James Jackson, commonly known as Onision. In January 2020, Hansen visited Jackson's home in an attempt to interview him. Jackson called the police on Hansen, though the police did not take action against him. Jackson also filed a lawsuit against Hansen, which took place on January 24, 2020. Jackson later requested to dismiss the charges, claiming that he was advised to consider an "alternative, more effective legal action". This dismissal request was granted.

Unseamly: The Investigation of Peter Nygard 
Chris Hansen was named as an executive producer for Unseamly: The Investigation of Peter Nygard, a Discovery+ show which examines Peter Nygard's life from his birth to his downfall and arrest.

Personal life 
Hansen first married to Mary Joan and has two sons. It was reported that in June 2018, Mary Joan filed for divorce after nearly 30 years of marriage. The family resided in Stamford, Connecticut. Hansen also maintained a New York City apartment; however, in January, 2019 it was reported that he was evicted after failing to pay rent for the apartment since the previous August. His mother, Patricia Hansen, died on March 1, 2020.

On November 13, 2021, Hanson married Gabrielle Gagnon.

Legal issues 
In January 2019, Hansen was charged with larceny after a check bounced with a vendor who delivered promotional items. Hansen turned himself in to police in Connecticut on January 14, 2019, for allegedly bouncing checks for nearly $13,000 worth of promotional materials, according to Stamford Police. The charges were later dropped.

In relation to a sting operation that occurred in October 2020, Hansen was supposed to appear and present evidence in a Shiawassee County Courtroom in Michigan in July 2021. Hansen did not show up for court. A warrant was issued for his arrest in July 2021.  Hansen later turned himself in, and stated that his failure to appear in court was because of a misunderstanding which was in the process of being resolved.

Awards
Hansen has received eight Emmy Awards, four Edward R. Murrow Awards, three Clarion awards, the Overseas Press Club award, an IRE, the National Press Club award, International Consortium of Investigative Journalists Award; as well as awards for excellence from the Associated Press and United Press International.

Appearances
Hansen has appeared on such television programs as The Daily Show with Jon Stewart, The Tonight Show with Jay Leno, Late Night with Conan O'Brien, The Adam Carolla Show, Today, Scarborough Country, The Oprah Winfrey Show, The Rise Guys Morning Show, The Don and Mike Show, The Opie and Anthony Radio Show, Jimmy Kimmel Live!, Glenn Beck Program, and Diggnation.

On January 9, 2007, Hansen appeared on the BET news series American Gangster. The special, which was hosted by actor Ving Rhames, focused on Detroit drug lords, the Chambers Brothers gang. Hansen gave insight into the lives of the brothers based on the reporting he had done on them in the 1980s and 1990s as a reporter for ABC affiliate WXYZ (Channel 7) and NBC affiliate WDIV (Channel 4). In 2020, Hansen also made a brief cameo himself in episode 1 of the second season of Amazon series The Boys.

References

Further reading

External links

Hansen's "Predator" blog
Hansen's "ID Thief" blog
Hansen's "Con Man" blog
The Hansen Files website

 

1959 births
American people of Danish descent
American podcasters
American television reporters and correspondents
Living people
Michigan State University alumni
NBC News people
Anti-pedophile activism
Internet memes
People from Lansing, Michigan
Television in Detroit
American male journalists
People from West Bloomfield, Michigan
People from Birmingham, Michigan
Brother Rice High School (Michigan) alumni
News & Documentary Emmy Award winners